David J. Cocker (born 27 April 1955) is a New Zealand former fencer. He competed in the individual épée event at the 1984 Summer Olympics.

References

External links
 

1955 births
Living people
New Zealand male épée fencers
Olympic fencers of New Zealand
Fencers at the 1984 Summer Olympics
Sportspeople from Auckland
20th-century New Zealand people
21st-century New Zealand people